Benjamin Isherwood may refer to:

Benjamin F. Isherwood (1822–1915), United States Navy admiral and early U.S. Navy engineer
, a United States Navy fleet replenishment oiler launched in 1988 but never completed and sold for scrapping in 2011

See also 
, the name of more than one United States Navy ship named for Benjamin F. Isherwood